Do Kuhaneh (also Romanized as Do Kūhāneh; also known as Cheshem Qūchān) is a village in Bandan Rural District, in the Central District of Nehbandan County, South Khorasan Province, Iran. At the 2006 census, its population was 101, in 26 families.

References 

Populated places in Nehbandan County